The National Institute of Statistics and Applied Economics (INSEA) is one of the oldest engineering schools in Morocco and remains to this day one of the most prestigious Moroccan Grandes écoles in engineering. Located in Rabat and created in 1961, its latest naming has changed by Royal Decree from the appellation The Training Centre of Engineers in Statistics in 1967 with the support of the Economic Commission for Africa (ECA).

Introduction 

INSEA provides training that gives equal weight to the statistics and economic analysis, and offers a specialization in the fields of computing, finance and the actuarial, demographic and operations research. This is the first school that offered training in computers at the national level and has developed the first computer to the kingdom and in the 1974.

The INSEA graduates have skills that allow them to perform the analysis and economic forecasting, the engineering of information systems and statistical expertise, but they are also capable of develop models to improve the sophisticated market analysis, refine the target marketing, and measure the risk in a variety of areas.

Furthermore, the training INSEA not limited to technical aspects of design, but also extends to the management, the communication and good knowledge of the socio-economic and political environment.
Graduates of INSEA are expected to play a strategic role at various stages of the process of economic and social development, pursuing careers in the public sector, local communities and the private sector: bank companies' Insurance and large companies and national multinationals.

The institute is under the supervision of the High Commissioner for Planning, National Board of Economic Planning of the country.

Specializations and careers 

Statistics

Statistics is the study of observations, its application areas are numerous and diverse, in fact almost all areas that lend themselves to numerical observations may be privileged fields of application.
An INSEAist statistician engineer may have different tasks: it is frequently entrusted with the planning of a full statistical study with constraints and objectives to meet. It must determine the number of observations necessary for the conclusions can be expressed with a level of certainty. It must, with experts in the field of study, discuss the variables mesurer.Il must explain the results of statistical analysis and specify, if necessary, restrictions on the conclusions given the methods and level of uncertainty present.
The engineering statistician can play the role of associate and / or consultant, he is also invited, on occasion, to play the role of expert. His expertise is often ad hoc, but still very important for the decision maker.
It may possibly be a member of a team of industrial production, collaboration is then as a specialist in quality assurance and reliability. The experimental research centers routinely use the statisticians.

Applied Economics

INSEA aims to train engineers for economists to engage in professional activities in the specialized services of private or public companies, financial sectors, international organizations and national or regional communities. The Engineering Economist has three main roles: researcher, interpreter and adviser. Analysis of vacancies released four major categories of posts for engineers economists: economic analysis and forecasting company is to develop tools that support the decision to develop the strategy development of the business analysis of economic information in the company through economic studies, statistical studies of economic organization in a study such as quantitative and / or qualitative study or as a macro and micro economic public agency. For example, economic diagnosis prior to a public intervention, special study for a local authority before an operation of urbanization.

Computer Science

In the perspectives to contribute to good business efficiency in the institutional domain, INSEA form of computer engineers from state to apply in the field of business management and help the organization and operation.
An engineer who holds a diploma in computer INSEA is capable of handling analysis, design, development and piloting information systems, control and implement the tools to achieve computerized information system. acquire a conceptual vision in a multidisciplinary environment at both strategic and operational levels and also develop strong skills in business management from a practical approach.
For outlets, a state engineer may be a computer systems architect information, a database administrator, an engineer in business management ...

Actuarial Sciences and Finance

The rapid development of financial markets worldwide, has expanded considerably to the theory of finance, so the banking, insurance and large companies need "experts" in this field.
In this perspective, INSEA began training engineers actuarial funding status since 1998, engineers familiar with the new financial theories, while mastering tools, mathematics and statistics at top level.
A state engineer holds a Diploma in Actuarial INSEA-finance can work in multiple markets such as market operators: they take positions and manage mission-oriented investment, hedging or speculation on behalf of institutions or customers; official who follows the market activities and control risk; fund manager: making investment choices, or take positions to ensure better use of the wallet, within the constraints of legislation and contracts spent with clients, managing assets / liabilities: Advisor of the Directorate General in the asset and liabilities, or organizer: adaptation and modernization of tools and methods.

Operational Research

Operations research is the application of scientific method to master the complex problems encountered in the direction and management systems in industry, commerce and administration. The aim is to take an aid to decision making. The curriculum at INSEA attempts to provide both: a preparation for life in Operations Research, research and preparation of OR in the following areas: Combinatorial optimization, Graphs and Combinatorics and Discrete Mathematics.
Through cross-training acquired in INSEA, the engineer in OR is as much an expert analysis of organizational processes and phenomena that specializes in the management, design and operation of systems information.
It can therefore work in the following areas: computerization of a business information management (job description), analysis of financial flows (work schedule), designing databases, development of Master Plan (quality control ) management of telecommunications (forecast) and also in the system design decision support (inventory management).

Student life 

INSEA offers students a residence with a capacity of 670 persons (290 in Buildings A and B, 240 in buildings C and D and 140 provided in the building E). The rooms are individual.
INSEA has developed since 1994 in a restaurant that prepares about 600 meals a day. The institute also has a library and a computer center with more than 100 machines.

Parascolar activities 

Forum of National Engineering elite Schools - GENI Rabat

The event, organized by INSEA together with two other major engineering schools in Madinat Al Irfane: INPT and ENSIAS is the Forum Student-Company Number 1 in Morocco on the one hand the number of visitors and other hand the number of participating companies and organizations. It is a meeting between students engineers, graduates and professional world. For this an exhibition space is available to participating companies to recruit and offer internships for engineering students, present their work and promote their image through the extensive media campaign covering the event. It is also an opportunity to discuss the theme through many conferences and roundtables throughout the two days of the event.

This event also knows the presence of several renowned personalities such as ministers, CEOs and CEO of large organizations.

The next edition of the Forum G.E.N.I. will take place in 2014 to the INPT.

Partnership and cooperation 

The National Institute of Statistics and Applied Economics INSEA concluded partnership agreements in research and training with several international institutions.

 National School of Statistics and Economic Administration ENSAE - France
 National School of Statistics and Information Analysis ENSAI - France
 Reims Management School - France
 Université Laval - Quebec - Canada

Directors of the Institute 

 1977 - 1996: Dr. Benyakhlef
 1996 - 2006: Mr. Abdelaziz Ghazali
 2008 - 2011: Mr. Abdelaziz Maalmi
 2011 - 2013: Mr. Abdelaziz Chaoubi
 2013 - 2016: PhD. Abdeslam Fazouane

Notable graduates 
 Taieb Fassi Fihri, Moroccan Minister of Foreign Affairs and Cooperation.
 Mohamed Horani, CEO of HPS and president of the General Confederation of Enterprises of Morocco (CGEM).
 Anis Birou, Secretary of State to the Minister of Tourism and Handicrafts, in charge of crafts in the Abbas El Fassi Government.
 Abdelaziz Rebbah, Minister of Transportations and former deputy and mayor of Kenitra and within the framework Justice and Development Party (PJD).
 Rkizi Chakib, Director General of the trading floor of Attijariwafa Bank.
 Mohamed Amine Bouabid, CEO of Salafin.
 Mohamed Saad, Chairman of MIT-GOV.
 Koudama Zeroual, Director at Wafa Assurance.
 Abdelaziz Mâalmi, President of the Union of Arab statisticians (ASU).
 Taamouti Mohamed, Director at Bank-Al-Maghrib.
 Saad Benjebbour, executive director at EFT "Banque Saudi Fransi (Saudi Arabia).
 El Hassan Adnani, Head of Risk Management at the People's Central Bank.
 Said Akram, Head of Research and Development at the Office des Changes.
 Adel Messouad, Head databases OHCHR Plan (HCP).
 Abdelkader Salmi, Head of R&D at the WRC.
 Abdennour Laaroubi, Entrepreneur and VP of Information Technology, Enpro, USA
 Lahcen Achy Deputy Director at International Monetary Fund ( Regional Training Center Kuwait).
REDIRECT

Associations  

 ADEI Association des élèves ingénieurs de l'INSEA,
 Sigma 21, Association des lauréats de l'INSEA.
 AMJI, Association marocaine des jeunes ingénieurs.
 FORUM GENI, Forum des grandes écoles nationales d'ingénieurs.
 CLUB INSEA TV
 CLUB SOCIAL 
 CLUB GOLDEN MEAN INSEA

Educational institutions established in 1961
Universities and colleges in Morocco
Education in Morocco
Rabat
1961 establishments in Morocco
Buildings and structures in Rabat
20th-century architecture in Morocco